Baby Hobson was an American Negro league infielder in the 1920s and 1930s.

Hobson made his Negro leagues debut in 1922 with the Richmond Giants. The following season he played for the Lincoln Giants.

References

External links
 and Seamheads

Year of birth missing
Year of death missing
Place of death missing
Lincoln Giants players
Richmond Giants players